Mylanie Barré (born July 25, 1979) is a Canadian sprint kayaker who has competed since the mid-2000s. She won a bronze medal in the K-2 1000 m event at the 2003 ICF Canoe Sprint World Championships in Gainesville.

Barré also competed in two Summer Olympics, earning her best finish of seventh in the K-2 500 m event at Athens in 2004.

Born in Budapest, Hungary, her parents also competed in the Summer Olympics. Barré's father, Denis, earned his best finish of eighth in the K-2 1000 m event at Montreal in 1976. Her mother, Alexandra, won two medals at Los Angeles in 1984 with a silver in the K-2 500 m and a bronze in the K-4 500 m events.

References

External links
 
 
 

1979 births
Canadian female canoeists
Canoeists at the 2004 Summer Olympics
Canoeists at the 2008 Summer Olympics
Hungarian emigrants to Canada
Living people
Olympic canoeists of Canada
Sportspeople from Quebec
ICF Canoe Sprint World Championships medalists in kayak